Aman Ullah Chowdhury is a Bangladesh Nationalist Party politician and the former Member of Parliament of Mymensingh-11.

Career
Chowdhury was elected to parliament from Mymensingh-11 as a Bangladesh Muslim League candidate in 1986 and Bangladesh Nationalist Party candidate in 1991 and February 1996.

Death
Chowdhury died on 8 June 2014 in Square Hospital, Dhaka.

References

External links 

 List of 3rd Parliament Members -Jatiya Sangsad (In Bangla)
 List of 5th Parliament Members -Jatiya Sangsad (In Bangla)
 List of 6th Parliament Members -Jatiya Sangsad (In Bangla)

2014 deaths
People from Bhaluka Upazila
Bangladesh Nationalist Party politicians
3rd Jatiya Sangsad members
5th Jatiya Sangsad members
6th Jatiya Sangsad members